Roberto López Alcaide (born 24 April 2000) is a Spanish professional footballer who plays as an attacking midfielder for CD Mirandés, on loan from Real Sociedad.

Club career
Born in Zaragoza, Aragon, López joined Real Sociedad's youth setup in 2015, from UD Amistad. During the 2017–18 season, while still a youth, he made his senior debut with the C-team in Tercera División.

On 20 June 2018, López renewed his contract until 2022 and was promoted to the reserves in Segunda División B. On 7 December, after already being a regular starter for the B-side, he further extended his deal until 2025.

López made his professional – and La Liga – debut on 14 January 2019, coming on as a second-half substitute for Luca Sangalli in a 3–2 home win against RCD Espanyol. Definitely promoted to the main squad for 2020–21, he scored his first goal in the top tier on 13 September 2020 by netting the equalizer in a 1–1 away draw against Real Valladolid. He returned the reserves to reinforce their squad after they were promoted to the Segunda División for the 2021–22 season.

On 27 June 2022, López was loaned to second division side CD Mirandés, for one year.

Career statistics

Club

References

External links

2000 births
Living people
Footballers from Zaragoza
Spanish footballers
Association football midfielders
La Liga players
Segunda División players
Segunda División B players
Tercera División players
Real Sociedad C footballers
Real Sociedad B footballers
Real Sociedad footballers
CD Mirandés footballers
Mediterranean Games gold medalists for Spain
Spain youth international footballers
Spain under-21 international footballers
Mediterranean Games medalists in football
Competitors at the 2018 Mediterranean Games